Ryan James Schofield (born 11 December 1999) is an English footballer who plays as a goalkeeper for Crawley Town, on loan from Huddersfield Town of the EFL Championship.

Club career
In January 2019, Schofield joined Notts County on loan for the remainder of the 2018–19 season.

Schofield made his senior league debut for Huddersfield on 23 October 2019 against Middlesbrough. He was loaned to Scottish Premiership club Livingston in January 2020. Schofield was injured during his first appearance for Livingston, which forced them to sign another goalkeeper.

Schofield played regularly for Huddersfield during the 2020–21 season, but lost his place after a 5–1 defeat to Fulham in August 2021. He then injured his shoulder while playing in a FA Cup tie at Burnley in January 2022.

He was loaned to Hibernian in August 2022. He was recalled by Huddersfield in January 2023, without having made a first team appearance for Hibs.

International career
In March 2017, Schofield made an appearance for the England under-18 team against Qatar. Schofield was included in an England U20 squad for the 2017 Toulon Tournament. He saved a penalty during the shoot-out in the final as England defeated the Ivory Coast to win the tournament.

Career statistics

Honours
England U20
Toulon Tournament: 2017

References

1999 births
Living people
English footballers
Association football goalkeepers
Huddersfield Town A.F.C. players
Newcastle United F.C. players
F.C. United of Manchester players
AFC Telford United players
Notts County F.C. players
Livingston F.C. players
National League (English football) players
English Football League players
England youth international footballers
Scottish Professional Football League players
Hibernian F.C. players